Blaze Busters is a 1950 short film directed by Robert Youngson. It centers on firefighters and the blazes they must extinguish. It is narrated by Dwight Weist.

The film was nominated for an Academy Award for Best Live Action Short Film at the 23rd Academy Awards.

References

External links

1950 films
1950 documentary films
Films directed by Robert Youngson
Films about firefighting
American short documentary films
Warner Bros. short films
1950s short documentary films
American black-and-white films
1950s American films